Khuwaylid is an Arabic name. Notable people with the name include:

Khuwaylid ibn Asad
Khadijah bint Khuwaylid
Halah bint Khuwailid
Awwam ibn Khuwaylid
Nawfal ibn Khuwaylid
Hizam ibn Khuwaylid